Davide Grassini (born 4 May 2000) is an Italian professional footballer who plays as a defender for  club San Giorgio.

Club career

Internazionale 
Born in Busto Arsizio, Grassini was a youth exponent of Inter.

Loan to Ravenna 
On 19 July 2019, Grassini was loaned to Serie C club Ravenna on a season-long loan deal. On 25 August he made his professional debut in Serie C as a substitute replacing Giacomo Nigretti in the 46th minute of a 2–1 away defeat against Fermana. One week later, on 1 September, he played his first entire match for the club, a 2–1 home defeat against Reggiana. Grassini ended his season long loan to Ravenna with 16 appearances, including 8 as a starter, and making 1 assist, however Ravenna was relegate to Serie D after having lost 3–0 on aggregate in the play-out against Alma Juventus Fano, he remained an unused substitute in both matches.

Carrarrese
On 14 September 2020 he signed with Carrarese.

Career statistics

Club

References

External links

2000 births
Living people
People from Busto Arsizio
Footballers from Lombardy
Italian footballers
Association football defenders
Serie C players
Inter Milan players
Ravenna F.C. players
Carrarese Calcio players
Italy youth international footballers
Sportspeople from the Province of Varese